Jason Culina (born 5 August 1980) is a former Australian soccer player and coach.

Club career 

Culina began his career with Sydney United under his father, Branko Culina, before moving to Ajax, where he struggled in the reserves. Only after moving to Twente did Culina begin to shine at the top level in club football. This was proved by his moving to another top Dutch club, PSV. While originally an attack-minded midfielder with Twente, at PSV Culina played more in a disciplined defensive role for the club with immediate success. In his final year at PSV, Culina was mainly deployed at right-back with further success, attributing to Culina's versatility and utility value.

On 9 January 2009, Culina announced his intention to return to Australia after turning down a contract extension from PSV as he sought a new challenge and a fresh start in Australia. "I want to make a fresh start and I am ready for a new challenge. I am the first international who returns to Australia and I am keen to promote the national competition and raise the standard."

On 14 January 2009, he was signed by Gold Coast United on a three-year contract, becoming the club's first marquee player. On 1 July 2009 he made his Gold Coast debut in a friendly in Singapore against a Singapore Olympic Selection, coming on as a substitute for Steve Pantelidis and scoring in the 88th minute from 25 yards out. On 22 February 2011, it was revealed Culina would join his father Branko Culina at Newcastle Jets. Culina was injured long-term and missed the 2011–12 season. His contract was set aside, but he continued his rehab and training with the club.

On 12 October 2012, Culina signed with A-League club Sydney FC. However, he lasted less than a year with the club, parting ways with the club in February 2013 after a disagreement with manager Frank Farina. Culina announced his retirement on 18 June 2013 at a Football Federation Australia function.

Coaching career
In 2015, Culina joined the King's School football coaching staff, helping with the school's first team. In 2016, Culina moved to St Joseph's College, and was the college's technical director of football and coach of the First XI.

On 16 August 2017, Culina was appointed head coach of Sydney United 58 after Mark Rudan resigned Culina announced his resignation from the role eight games into the season, with four wins and four losses to his side's name.

Culina is now coach of Sydney United 58 FC under 12's.

International career 

Culina made his debut for the Australia national team against South Africa in 2005. He became a regular starter for the Socceroos under head coach Guus Hiddink, who was also his club coach at PSV. His first international goal came in September 2005, against the Solomon Islands in Sydney. Culina played in both legs of the World Cup play-off against Uruguay where Australia qualified for the 2006 World Cup following a dramatic penalty shoot-out. He was selected in the Australian squad for the World Cup, held in Germany, and started all four of Australia's matches.

On 3 March 2010, Culina was named captain of Australia for the first time, in an AFC Asian Cup qualifier against Indonesia, a 1–0 victory. On 18 June 2013, he announced his official international retirement at a function held before Australia's World Cup qualifier against Iraq.

Personal life 
Culina is the youngest son of former Sydney FC and Newcastle Jets coach Branko Culina. He is of Croatian descent.

On 5 February 2007, Culina and his wife Terri welcomed their first child, a boy named Roman.

Career statistics

Club

International
Score and result list Australia's goal tally first, score column indicates score after Culina goal.

Honours
Ajax
 KNVB Cup: 2001–02
 Johan Cruyff Shield: 2002
 Eredivisie: 2003–04

PSV
 Eredivisie: 2005–06, 2006–07, 2007–08
 Russian Railways Cup: 2007
 Johan Cruyff Shield: 2008

Individual 
 Gold Coast United Player of the Year: 2009–10

References

External links 

 
 Gold Coast United profile
 Oz Football profile
 Migration Heritage Centre feature on Culina family

1980 births
Living people
Australian people of Croatian descent
Soccer players from Melbourne
Australian expatriate sportspeople in Belgium
Australian expatriate soccer players
Australia international soccer players
2006 FIFA World Cup players
Olympic soccer players of Australia
Footballers at the 2000 Summer Olympics
2005 FIFA Confederations Cup players
Expatriate footballers in Belgium
Australian expatriate sportspeople in the Netherlands
Expatriate footballers in the Netherlands
National Soccer League (Australia) players
Belgian Pro League players
Eredivisie players
AFC Ajax players
De Graafschap players
FC Twente players
PSV Eindhoven players
Beerschot A.C. players
Gold Coast United FC players
Melbourne Knights FC players
Sydney Olympic FC players
Sydney United 58 FC players
A-League Men players
2007 AFC Asian Cup players
2010 FIFA World Cup players
2011 AFC Asian Cup players
Sydney FC players
Association football midfielders
Sydney United 58 FC managers
Marquee players (A-League Men)
Australian soccer coaches
Australian soccer players